Konstantinos Roukounakis (born 17 July 2001) is a Greek professional footballer who plays as a midfielder for Super League 2 club AEK Athens B.

References

2001 births
Living people
Super League Greece 2 players
AEK Athens F.C. players
Association football midfielders
Footballers from Athens
Greek footballers
AEK Athens F.C. B players